Maryland Correctional Institution for Women (MCI-W) is a multi-level security prison operated by the Maryland Department of Public Safety and Correctional Services in Jessup, Maryland.

Prisoners
Diane Sawyer visited the prison in 2015 for a special ABC report on women behind bars. Women at the prison stitch flags for Maryland government agencies. Women helped write plays that were eventually performed outside of prison. Yoga classes have been taught at the prison.

Education
Goucher College offers courses to inmates at MCI-W.

Notable incidents
In 2013, a Department of Justice report found higher-than-average rates of guard-on-inmate sexual abuse.

Inmates

Former
Heather Cook
Felicia "Snoopy" Pearson

Current
 Brittany Norwood
 Wendi Michelle Scott
  Erika Sifrit

References

External links
Maryland Correctional Institution for Women

Prisons in Maryland
Women's prisons in the United States
Government buildings in Maryland
Jessup, Maryland
Women in Maryland